Lucy Caldwell  (born 1981) is a Northern Irish playwright and novelist. She was the winner of the 2021 BBC National Short Story Award.

Biography
Born in Belfast in 1981 in what she later described as into one of the darkest and most turbulent years of the Troubles: the year the hunger strikes began, when within a few months Bobby Sands and nine others died; when things seemed to be spiralling irrevocably out of control. She studied at Strathearn School and later at Queens' College, Cambridge, graduating with a First Class Degree, and Goldsmiths College, London. Caldwell left the city she had always considered 'boring, introverted' in 1999 but later declared 'yes, it's true: I do love this city, and I do love these streets, and I am proud to be from here.'

In June 2004, Caldwell's first short play, The River was performed at the Royal Welsh College of Music & Drama, and subsequently the Edinburgh Festival Fringe. The play won her the PMA Most Promising Playwright Award. Caldwell spent time as writer-on-attachment to the National Theatre in 2005. Her first full-length play, Leaves, won the 2006 George Devine Award, the 2007 Susan Smith Blackburn Prize and the BBC Stewart Parker Award. In 2007 it was produced by the Druid Theatre Company, and directed by Garry Hynes. The play premiered in Galway before transferring to the Royal Court Theatre.

Her second full-length play, Guardians, premiered at the 2009 HighTide Festival in Halesworth. Reviewing the production, critic Michael Billington wrote, "[Caldwell] writes with real power about lost love. I was much moved." Notes to Future Self was produced at the Birmingham Repertory Theatre in March 2011, directed by Rachel Kavanaugh. It was described in The Stage as "Brave, beautiful, and quite extraordinary"

Caldwell's first novel, Where They Were Missed, set in Belfast and County Donegal was published in February 2006 and short-listed for the 2006 Dylan Thomas Prize. It was described by Vogue as "a debut reminiscent of Ian McEwan's The Cement Garden and Trezza Azzopardi's The Hiding Place.

Her second novel, The Meeting Point, centred around a young Irish missionary couple who journey to Bahrain, was published in February 2011 by Faber. It was described by the Sunday Times as "Compelling, passionate and deeply resonant" and by the Guardian as "haunting... compulsively readable"

Caldwell's radio play, Girl From Mars, broadcast by BBC Radio 4 in 2008, won the Irish Playwrights' and Screenwriters' Guild Award ("ZeBBie") for Best Radio Play and the BBC's Richard Imison Award for best script by a writer new to radio. In their verdict, the judges said:This is a gripping and powerful depiction of the effect on a family when one sibling goes missing.  The beautifully-told story begins when a body is found and the remaining daughter returns to be with her family while they await identification. Girl From Mars is moving and emotionally taut.  It veers away from sentimentality and felt personal and believable.  The structure is complex – combining three different timescales – and uses radio to its full potential, using many techniques including voice-overs, dialogue, text messages, and voice mail. The story has a shades-of-grey resolution about the way a person's life can tragically stop short – and this is echoed in the subtle way the writer ends her own play too.

In 2012 she was the recipient of a Major Individual Artist Award from the Arts Council of Northern Ireland. Her novel, All the Beggars Riding, published in 2013, was shortlisted for both the Kerry Group Irish Fiction Award and the Fiction Uncovered selection and was chosen as Belfast's One City One Book.

Caldwell won the 2021 BBC National Short Story Award for "All the People Were Mean and Bad".

Novels & Plays

Novels
 Where They Were Missed (Faber, 2005) , 
 The Meeting Point (Faber, 2011) , 
 All the Beggars Riding (Faber, 2013) , 
 Multitudes: eleven stories (Faber, 2016) , 
 These Days (Faber, 2022)

Stage Plays
 Leaves (2007) ,  ; Chapel Lane, Galway, transferring to the Royal Court (Upstairs), London
 Carnival (2008) produced by Kabosh at Edinburgh Festival Spiegeltent
 Guardians (2009)
 The Luthier (2009) Origin Theatre Company as part of the New York 1st Irish Festival
 Notes to Future Self (2011) at Birmingham Repertory Theatre Company
 Hier Soir, Demain Soir (2012), commissioned by the Comédie de Valence, for Festival Ambivalence(s)

Radio Plays
 Girl from Mars (2008) BBC Radio 4
 Avenues of Eternal Peace (2009) BBC Radio 4
 The Watcher on the Wall (2013) BBC Radio 4

Awards and honours
 2006 George Devine Award for Leaves
 2007: Susan Smith Blackburn Award for Leaves
 2009: Irish Playwrights' and Screenwriters' Guild Award for Girl From Mars
 2009: Richard Imison Award for Girl From Mars
 2011: Rooney Prize for Irish Literature.
 2011: Dylan Thomas Prize for The Meeting Point
 2013: Kerry Group Irish Fiction Award (shortlisted) for All the Beggars Riding
 2018: Elected Fellow of the Royal Society of Literature in its "40 Under 40" initiative.
 2021: BBC National Short Story Award for "All the People Were Mean and Bad".

References

External links
 Official website http://www.lucycaldwell.com
 Paperback review: All the Beggars Riding, By Lucy Caldwell (Saturday 16 March 2013) https://www.independent.co.uk/arts-entertainment/books/reviews/paperback-review-all-the-beggars-riding-by-lucy-caldwell-8537406.html
 Lucy Caldwell’s All the Beggars Riding is Belfast’s choice for One City One Book 2013 (Wednesday 6 February 2013) http://www.artscouncil-ni.org/news/lucy-caldwells-all-the-beggars-riding-is-belfasts-choice-for-one-city-one-b
 One Minute With: Lucy Caldwell (Friday 1 February 2013) https://www.independent.co.uk/arts-entertainment/books/features/one-minute-with-lucy-caldwell-novelist-8475320.html
 The Meeting Point, By Lucy Caldwell (Friday 11 February 2011) https://www.independent.co.uk/arts-entertainment/books/reviews/the-meeting-point-by-lucy-caldwell-2210899.html

1981 births
Living people
Alumni of Queens' College, Cambridge
Alumni of Goldsmiths, University of London
Women dramatists and playwrights from Northern Ireland
Women novelists from Northern Ireland
People educated at Strathearn School
Writers from Belfast
Date of birth missing (living people)
21st-century novelists from Northern Ireland
Fellows of the Royal Society of Literature
21st-century women writers from Northern Ireland